Placerville Speedway is a 1/4 mile dirt track located in Placerville at the El Dorado County fairgrounds in the Sierra Nevada foothills of eastern California.

History
The track began in 1965 as "Hangtown Speedway".

On November 20, 2019, the speedway held the Elk Grove Ford Hangtown 100, a 100-lap, $20,000-to-win USAC National Midget Series race which was won by Kyle Larson. It was the first time that the national midgets raced at the track. That same year, the World of Outlaws sprint cars made their first appearance at the track in approximately twenty years. In 2020, the weekly races were broadcast on FloRacing as the track was not allowed to have fans due to the global pandemic.

Notable drivers
Kyle Larson - made his first sprint car start and won his first sprint car feature at the track. Larson considers the speedway to be his home track.

References

Motorsport venues in California
Placerville, California
1965 establishments in California